Stefan Dimitrov Todorov (5 February 1889 – 26 August 1944), better known as Stanke Dimitrov (Станке Димитров) or under the pseudonym Marek (Марек), was a high-ranking Bulgarian Communist Party activist and anti-fascist.

Todorov was born in Dupnitsa. He was one of the supporters of a plan that later became the St Nedelya Church assault. He died in an aviation accident near Bryansk, aged 56.

Stanke Dimitrov Air Strip in Bulgaria is named after him.

References 

Bulgarian communists
1889 births
1944 deaths
People from Dupnitsa